Mexibús is a bus rapid transit (BRT) system that is located in the Greater Mexico City part of the State of Mexico, which surrounds Mexico City proper.

It is operated by Transmasivo S.A. (Lines I and IV), Transcomunicador S.A. (Line II), and Red de Transporte de Oriente S.A. de C.V. (Line III).

Network

Fare and schedule
The fare is 9 Mexican pesos (MXN) paid via rechargeable cards which cost 18 pesos and include 9 pesos in transit credit.

Service operates daily from 4:30 A.M. to 12:30 A.M.

Lines

Line I: Ciudad Azteca – Ojo de Agua – Terminal de Pasajeros (AIFA)

Mexibús Line I serves the northeastern suburbs, operating from Ciudad Azteca (terminus of Line B of the Mexico City metro), to Ojo de Agua, the concession is in hands of Transmasivo S.A. which operates both regular and express routes. It is 20 km long with 34 stations, and approximately 130,000 users per day. 75 articulated Volvo 7300 BRT buses ply the route painted white with red, light green and dark green trim. It began free operations in October 2010. On March 21, 2022, the line started servicing the Felipe Ángeles International Airport, in Zumpango.

Line II: Las Américas – La Quebrada 

Mexibús Line II runs 21.3 km long, from Fraccionamiento Las Américas in Ecatepec to La Quebrada, in Cuautitlán Izcalli, running along Avenida Primero de Mayo, Avenida Revolución and Avenida José López Portillo; it has 43 stations and 97 buses. Urbanbus is the concessionnaire.

This line connects two largest commercial centers of the far north metropolitan area: Perinorte and Plaza Las Américas. As of mid-2013 it was expected that the service would be operational in 2014. But it was until January 2015 when it was opened.

Line III: Pantitlán – Chimalhuacán

Mexibús Line III was the second line in service. It runs 14.5 kilometers from Pantitlán (transfer for multiple lines of the Mexico City Metro) in Mexico City proper to Chimalhuacán, State of Mexico. The concessionaire is Red de Transporte de Oriente S.A. de C.V. There are 30 stations, 2 terminals, and 85 buses. The line began construction at the end of 2010

and began operations 30 April 2013.

Line IV: Indios Verdes – Universidad Mexiquense del Bicentenario 

Mexibús Line IV is the fourth line in service. It runs 22.3 kilometers from Indios Verdes (transport hub for multiple transport services) in Mexico City proper to Ojo de Agua, Tecámac, State of Mexico. The concessionaire is Transmasivo. There are 28 operative stations, 1 under-construction station, 2 terminals, and 71 buses. The line began construction in June 2014, and was expected to open since 2015. It started free pre-operative tests on 24 February 2021. Operations started on 9 October 2021.

Expansion
Mexibús plans to extend Line IV to Felipe Ángeles International Airport ("AIFA") by 2023, adding to current service that Line I provides. Line IV is expected to be expanded southward toward La Raza metro station.

References

External links

  (Line I)
  (Line II)
  (Line III)
  (Line IV)